Lybster is a village on the east coast of Caithness in northern Scotland. It was once a big herring fishing port.

The Waterlines heritage museum is located in Lybster Harbour and provides information on the history and geology of Lybster. A small number of crab fishing boats also operate from Lybster Harbour.

Lybster lies at the end of the tenth stage of the John o' Groats Trail, a long-distance walking trail from Inverness to John o' Groats.

History
Lybster owes its origin to the fishing industry. A wooden pier was built in 1790 for use by the fishing boats. The village was founded in 1802 as a planned village by the local landowner, General Patrick Sinclair and his sons continued with its development. By 1859 some 357 boats operated from the harbour, making it the third busiest fishing port in Scotland, only exceeded by Wick and Fraserburgh. By this time there were some 1500 fishermen at sea, and other servicing the industry on land. Lybster railway station was part of the Wick and Lybster Railway. It opened on 1 July 1903 and closed on 3 April 1944, having been overtaken by events, the opening up of the road for traffic and the decline of the herring industry. A white-fish fleet operated from the port in the 1900s, but that dwindled too, and now the harbour is used by fishing boats catching lobsters and crabs, and recreational craft.

Lybster was an important port in the herring industry in the nineteenth century. Lybster declined in importance as a herring fishing port before the First World War as the local industry concentrated in Wick.

It hosts the "World Championships of Knotty"; knotty or cnatag is a variant of shinty.

The film, Silver Darlings, from Neil Gunn's book, was shot here. In 2019, Lybster was used as a location for shooting the Netflix drama, The Crown.

The Sinclairs of Lybster have long roots running back to the Sinclair earls who ruled Caithness that was once a much larger area taking in much of Sutherland. Tracing further back the family has connections to the Norwegian earls who controlled the north of Scotland for centuries.

Patrick Sinclair
Lybster's sister city is Mackinac Island, United States. One of the more famous of the clan was Patrick Sinclair. Today there is a pub on Mackinac Island that bears his name. Ironically it is an Irish pub.

Gallery

References

External links

 
Lybster

Populated places in Caithness